Michael Kagan is a Brooklyn-based artist.

Biography 

Born in 1980 in Virginia Beach, Michael Kagan received his BA from The George Washington University and MFA from New York Academy of Art, where he also completed a postgraduate fellowship in 2005.

Kagan has exhibited worldwide in group and solo exhibitions including an upcoming exhibition at Almine Rech in London (2022); Bill Brady Gallery, Miami, FL, USA (2018); and a recent solo exhibition at Virginia Museum of Contemporary Art, Virginia Beach, VA, USA (2019/2020).

Kagan’s work is in the private collections of the Hall Art Foundation, Reading, VT, USA; Maki Collection, Tokyo, Japan; amongst others.

Special projects include a painting commission from The Smithsonian, an apparel collaboration with Pharrell Williams and the Billionaire Boys Club, and album cover artwork for The White Lies album Big TV which won an Art Vinyl award for Best Art Vinyl, 2013. A recent monograph of his work was released in 2019 by ARTBOOK | DAP.

References

External links 
 ARTBOOK | DAP
 Michael Kagan

1980 births
Living people
George Washington University alumni
Artists from Brooklyn